Hoofbeats of Vengeance is a 1929 American silent Western film directed by Henry MacRae and written by George H. Plympton. The film stars Rex the Wonder Horse, Jack Perrin, Helen Foster, Al Ferguson, Starlight the Horse and Markee the Horse. The film was released on June 4, 1929, by Universal Pictures.

Plot

Cast     
 Rex the Wonder Horse as Rex the Wonder Horse
 Jack Perrin as Sgt. Jack Gordon
 Helen Foster as Mary Martin
 Al Ferguson as Jud Regan
 Starlight the Horse as Starlight
 Markee the Horse as Markee

References

External links
 

1929 films
1929 Western (genre) films
Universal Pictures films
Films directed by Henry MacRae
American black-and-white films
Silent American Western (genre) films
Films with screenplays by George H. Plympton
1920s English-language films
1920s American films